Bridgeville Historic District, also known as Lewisville and Lewis' Wharf, is a national historic district located at Bridgeville, Sussex County, Delaware.  The district includes 166 contributing buildings and 70 contributing structures at Bridgeville, a center of agricultural commerce. The district is primarily residential with resources built from the second quarter of the 19th century through the Great Depression.  The dwellings are in a variety of vernacular forms including the "I-house," Shotgun house, and late 19th and 20th century revivals.  Located in the district and separately listed are the Bridgeville Public Library and Old Bridgeville Fire House.

It was added to the National Register of Historic Places in 1994.

References

Historic districts on the National Register of Historic Places in Delaware
Historic districts in Sussex County, Delaware
National Register of Historic Places in Sussex County, Delaware